The 1st constituency of the Vaucluse (French: Première circonscription de Vaucluse) is a French legislative constituency in the Vaucluse département. Like the other 576 French constituencies, it elects one MP using the two-round system, with a run-off if no candidate receives over 50% of the vote in the first round.

Description

The 1st constituency of the Vaucluse covers the city of Avignon.

Between 1988 and 2012, the seat has fluctuated between left and right, before first turning to the centre in 2017, before being won by the far-right in 2022. Only Marie-Josée Roig has succeeded in retaining the seat since 1988.

Assembly Members

Election results

2022

 
 
 
 
 
|-
| colspan="8" bgcolor="#E9E9E9"|
|-

2017

 
 
 
 
 
 
 
|-
| colspan="8" bgcolor="#E9E9E9"|
|-

2012

 
 
 
 
 
|-
| colspan="8" bgcolor="#E9E9E9"|
|-

2007

 
 
 
 
 
 
 
|-
| colspan="8" bgcolor="#E9E9E9"|
|-

2002

 
 
 
 
|-
| colspan="8" bgcolor="#E9E9E9"|
|-

1997

 
 
 
 
 
|-
| colspan="8" bgcolor="#E9E9E9"|
|-

References

1